St. James Led to His Execution was a painting by Andrea Mantegna. It was destroyed on March 11, 1944, when the Ovetari Chapel in Padua was bombed by the Allies during World War II.

The British Museum owns a preparatory drawing for the painting.

Lost paintings
Paintings by Andrea Mantegna
Paintings about death
Christian art about death
1450s paintings
Paintings in Padua